Pomacentrus smithi, Smith's damselfish, is a species of damselfish from the family Pomacentridae which is found in the Western Central Pacific. It occasionally makes its way into the aquarium trade. It grows to a size of 7 cm in length. The specific name honours the American ichthyologist Hugh McCormick Smith (1865-1941).

References

smithi
Fish described in 1928